Manoliu is a Romanian surname. Notable people with the surname include:

Gheorghe Manoliu (1888–1980), Romanian major general
Lia Manoliu (1932–1998), Romanian discus thrower
Petru Manoliu (1903–1976), Romanian novelist, essayist, and newspaper editor

Romanian-language surnames